Kolyma Hydroelectric Station is located on the Kolyma River in the village of Sinegorye, Yagodninsky District, Magadan Oblast Russia. It has an installed power generation capacity of 900 MW. Kolyma HPP is the basis of the energy system of Magadan Oblast; it produces about 95% of the electricity in the region. It is the upper stage of the Kolyma cascade, while the lower one (Ust-Srednekan Hydroelectric Plant) of 570 MW installed capacity is under construction.

Construction began in 1974 and the first generator was commissioned in 1982, the last in 1994. Construction of the Kolyma HPP was carried out in the harsh climatic conditions in the zone of permafrost. At , it is the highest earth filled dam in Russia. It is also the most powerful hydroelectric plant in the country with an underground power station.

See also
Kolyma Reservoir
Taskan

References

External links

Dams in Russia
Hydroelectric power stations in Russia
Rock-filled dams
Dams completed in 1982
Energy infrastructure completed in 1994
1994 establishments in Russia
Buildings and structures in Magadan Oblast
Underground power stations
1982 establishments in the Soviet Union
Hydroelectric power stations built in the Soviet Union
Kolyma basin